Gordana Gadžić (born 21 August 1955) is a Serbian actress. She has appeared in more than 30 films since 1981.

Selected filmography

References

External links 

1955 births
Living people
Actresses from Belgrade
Serbian film actresses
20th-century Serbian actresses
21st-century Serbian actresses
Golden Arena winners